1997 Sanfrecce Hiroshima season

Competitions

Domestic results

J.League

Emperor's Cup

J.League Cup

Player statistics

 † player(s) joined the team after the opening of this season.

Transfers

In:

Out:

Transfers during the season

In
Kazuyoshi Matsunaga
Toru Yasutake (from Sanfrecce Hiroshima youth)
Minoru Ueda
Shoji Akimitsu
Takahisa Iwamura (from Sanfrecce Hiroshima youth)
Ryoji Araki
Ian Stuart Crook (from Norwich City on July)

Out
Santos (on June)

Awards
none

References
J.LEAGUE OFFICIAL GUIDE 1997, 1997 
J.LEAGUE OFFICIAL GUIDE 1998, 1996 
J.LEAGUE YEARBOOK 1999, 1999

Other pages
 J. League official site
 Sanfrecce Hiroshima official site

Sanfrecce Hiroshima
Sanfrecce Hiroshima seasons